Kang Keqing (K'ang K'e-ching; ; September 7, 1911 – April 22, 1992) was a politician of the People's Republic of China, and the wife of Zhu De until his death in 1976.

Early life
Kang was born to a Hakka fishing family in the township of Luotangwan Wan'an County, Jiangxi Province. In order to make ends meet, her parents sold five daughters in succession to other families as brides. Kang was given away when she was 40 days old to a tenant farmer called Luo Qigui. Her future husband had not yet been born at this point and, when the Luo family finally had their child, it was a girl. This child died and Kang was cared for by the Luo family as a daughter; living in a peasant family, Kang was the main source of labour for her adopted parents.

Revolution
In 1924, the Wan'an County Communist member arrived in Kang's village as part of the Northern Expedition and set up various activities to promote revolution, including plays and a night school. The member also promulgated concepts of gender equality and freedom in marriage. At approximately age 14, Kang became a member of the Red Army. She would later promulgate the idea that feudalism, imperialism, and bureaucratic capitalism were the main enemies of the female labourer.

She was elected permanent secretary of the Luotangwan Village Women's Association and was the first local woman to cut her hair short. From this point onwards, Kang took every opportunity to pursue studies that her background had denied her as a child. In 1927, Chiang Kai-shek opposed the Communists and there was violent conflict. Nearly 200 people in Wan'an were killed and, to temper Kang's revolutionary tendencies, her adoptive parents attempted to arrange a marriage for her. Kang left home in September 1928 and joined a guerilla band seeking shelter with the Red Army.

Agnes Smedley's biography of Zhu describes her as follows:

″Up from the Wanan district to the west came a delegation of Peasant Partisans, and among them was the woman leader Kang.  She carried a rifle as if it were a part of her and, like the men, she walked with lithe decision and certainty.  A woman in her middle twenties, of medium height and shingled hair, she wore the usual clean blue jacket and long loose trousers of the peasant woman.  Her face was pock-marked and men said that because of this she was not beautiful.  But they admitted that her large black eyes were beautiful and shone with the fire of conviction, and when she smiled, two rows of white teeth gleamed between beautiful red lips.  Illiterate she was indeed, for she had been the slave of a rich landlord who had bought her in childhood and used her a field laborer.  Though she could recognise but a few written characters, still she was very intelligent so that men said of her:
″'Her thoughts are as clear and direct as bullets fired from a machine-gun.'″

Kang married Zhu De on 30 December 1930. In 1932, she was made leader of a newly created branch of women volunteers, who were trained in the Red Army School.

Long March
She became a women's leader in the Red Army and was one of a small number of women who were on the Long March. In the division of the Fourth Red Army, Kang was sent with Zhu De and Zhang Guotao.

In October 1935, Kang fell ill after Zhang Guotao's disastrous attempt to establish a communist base in Sichuan. Zhang reportedly kept Kang separated from her husband and attempted to leave her behind when the Fourth Red army moved to Shaanxi, but Zhu managed to bring a doctor and ensured Kang was carried on a stretcher through the Gold Mountains.

Yan'an
Kang was interviewed by the American journalist Helen Foster Snow during her stay in Yan'an. She commented on the military situation, telling Foster Snow that the army's numbers were a problem, but the issue of weaponry was urgent. Kang maintained contact with Foster Snow after this, even giving a speech at a 1991 conference congratulating her on being made Friendship Ambassador to China.

People's Republic of China
Kang served as vice chairman of the Chinese People's Political Consultative Conference (CPPCC), chairman of the All-China Women's Federation, and president of Soong Ching-ling Foundation.

Cultural Revolution
During the Cultural Revolution, Kang was under house arrest. She was later rehabilitated.

Rehabilitation
After the fall of the Gang of Four, Kang was instated as the head of the All-China Women's Federation and is credited with centralising the organisation's bureaucracy. She was a member of the 11th and 12th Central Committees of the Communist Party of China (1977-1987).

Women's Rights
Kang's ideology in the fight for women's liberation is embodied in the slogan 'Seek liberation in war, seek equality in production'. 'Liberation in war' referred to women joining the revolutionary struggle to attain equality, while 'equality in production' meant that women should attain powers equal to those granted to men. This included the right to labour, which Kang considered fundamental to improving women's economic position. Kang argued 'equality' should also be expanded to politics, culture, science, and technology.

At the first meeting of the China Women's Committee in 1949, Kang made a speech advocating the liberation of women's labour and economic development.

Notes

References 

1911 births
1992 deaths
Zhu De family
All-China Women's Federation people
People's Republic of China politicians from Jiangxi
Politicians from Ji'an
Women in war in China
Chinese politicians of Hakka descent
Chinese Communist Party politicians from Jiangxi
Vice Chairpersons of the National Committee of the Chinese People's Political Consultative Conference
Burials at Babaoshan Revolutionary Cemetery